Thomas Henry Crossley was an English professional footballer who played as an outside forward. Born in Blackburn, Lancashire, he was signed by Football League club Burnley in 1891. Crossley made his only senior appearance for Burnley on 10 February 1891 in the 0–4 defeat away at Notts County, and left the club shortly afterwards.

References

Year of birth missing
Year of death missing
Footballers from Blackburn
English footballers
Association football forwards
Burnley F.C. players
English Football League players
Association football midfielders